Cryptolepis sanguinolenta is a species of flowering plant in the family Apocynaceae. An extract from the root is traditionally used in West Africa for malaria.

The roots of Cryptolepis sanguinolenta contain a major alkaloid called cryptolepine.

The roots are also used as a yellow dye.

References

External links 
 International Plant Names Index

Periplocoideae
Flora of Africa
Plants described in 1825
Plant dyes